José Cossio (born 4 November 1942) is a Spanish former swimmer. He competed in the men's 400 metre freestyle at the 1960 Summer Olympics.

References

External links
 

1942 births
Living people
Olympic swimmers of Spain
Swimmers at the 1960 Summer Olympics
Universiade medalists in swimming
Sportspeople from Las Palmas
Universiade bronze medalists for Spain
Spanish male freestyle swimmers
Medalists at the 1959 Summer Universiade